was a Japanese stage and screen actress whose career spanned seven decades.

Biography
Yamada was born in Osaka as Mitsu Yamada, the daughter of Kusudu Yamada, a shinpa actor specialising in onnagata roles, and Ritsu, a geisha. Under her mother's influence, she began learning nagauta and Japanese traditional dance from the age of six.

Yamada debuted as a film actress in 1930 at age twelve, appearing in the Nikkatsu film Tsurugi wo koete opposite Denjirō Ōkōchi. She soon became one of Nikkatsu's top actresses, but it was her portrayals of strong-willed modern girls in Kenji Mizoguchi's Osaka Elegy and Sisters of the Gion in 1936 at the new Daiichi Eiga studio that earned her popularity and critical acclaim. Moving to Shinkō Kinema and then to Toho, she became  a star with Mikio Naruse's Tsuruhachi and Tsurujiro (1938), appearing at the side of Kazuo Hasegawa. During World War II, she established the theatre group Shin Engi-za together with Hasegawa, and appeared in films such as Naruse's The Song Lantern (1943) and The Way of Drama (Shibaido, 1944).

In 1946, in opposition to the union strike at Toho, Yamada sided with the anti-unionist group "Jū hito no hata no kai" ("Society of the Flag of Ten"), which consisted of Hasegawa, Setsuko Hara, Hideko Takamine and others. She moved from Toho to the Shintoho studios, but later left Shintoho as well to become a freelancer. She married leftist actor Yoshi Katō, her third husband, and in the wake returned to the union, joined the Mingei Theatre Company and co-founded the Gendai Haiyu Kyokai theatre group.

During the second half of the 1950s, Yamada's main attention shifted towards the stage, but she still appeared in a number of distinguished films like Naruse's Flowing (1956), Yasujirō Ozu's Tokyo Twilight (1957) and Akira Kurosawa's The Lower Depths (1957) and Throne of Blood (1957). Other directors she worked with during this decade include Keisuke Kinoshita, Kaneto Shindō and Shirō Toyoda. In addition to her theatre engagements, she appeared on television, including the long-running Hissatsu series. Her last TV appearance was in 2002.

Yamada died from multiple organ failure in Tokyo on 9 July 2012 at the age of 95. She was married four times, to actor Ichirō Tsukita, to producer Kazuo Takimura, to actor Yoshi Katō, and to actor Tsutomu Shimomoto. Her daughter with Tsukita, Michiko, became known as the actress Michiko Saga (1935–1992).

Awards (selected)
Yamada earned the Blue Ribbon Award and the Mainichi Film Award For Best Actress simultaneously two times: in 1952 for Gendai-jin and Hakone fūunroku, and in 1956 for Boshizō, A Cat, Shozo, and Two Women, and Flowing. She also received the Blue Ribbon Award For Best Supporting Actress in 1955 for Takekurabe and Ishigassen. In 1995, she received a Special Award from the Chairman of the Japan Academy in honour of her lifetime achievements in cinema. 

For her work on stage, she has been awarded at the Agency for Cultural Affairs' Arts Festival three times for the plays Tanuki (1974), Aizome Takao (1977), and Daiyu-san (1983).

She was named a Person of Cultural Merit by the Japanese government in 1993 and became the first actress to receive the Order of Culture in 2000.

Filmography (selected)

Film

Television

References

External links
 
 

Japanese film actresses
Actresses from Osaka
1917 births
Persons of Cultural Merit
Recipients of the Order of Culture
2012 deaths
20th-century Japanese actresses